Oddvar Einarson (born 7 February 1949) is a Norwegian movie director. He made his debut with the film Time i nyttelære in 1967 and has since directed a number of films, some of the best known being: Kampen om Mardøla (1972), Prognose Innerdalen (1981), X (1986), Karachi (1989) and Havet stiger (1990).

In 1987 he won the Norwegian movie award Amanda for best Norwegian film: X.

Filmography
Finanseventyret (2012; documentary)
Pust på meg (1996)	 	
Havet stiger (1990)
Karachi (1988)	
X (1986)	 	
Prognose Innerdalen (1981)

See also
The Mardal waterfall

References

External links
The fight over the Mardøla river (a film; article in Norwegian)

1949 births
Living people
Norwegian film directors